Gabriel Chironi (born 16 December 1991) is an Argentine footballer who plays for Spanish club Linense as a midfielder.

References

External links
 
 
 

1991 births
Living people
People from Neuquén
Argentine footballers
Association football midfielders
Argentine Primera División players
Primera Nacional players
Torneo Federal A players
Club Cipolletti footballers
Crucero del Norte footballers
Serie D players
U.S. Castrovillari Calcio players
A.C. Savoia 1908 players
Segunda División B players
Real Balompédica Linense footballers
Argentine expatriate footballers
Argentine expatriate sportspeople in Spain
Expatriate footballers in Spain